Girija is one of the names of Parvati, the wife of the Hindu god Shiva.  The word in Sanskrit means "one who is born to mountain (Giri)".

Girija Kalyanam means the Marriage of Girija, is popular novel by Yaddanapudi Sulochana Rani, which was made into a film and a TV serial.

Girija may refer to:

People
 Girija (actress) (1938–1995), Telugu film actress
 V. M. Girija (born 1961), Indian poet and essayist

Given name
 Girija Shankar Bajpai (1891–1954), Indian civil servant and diplomat
 Girija Devi (1929–2017), Indian classical singer of the Banaras gharana
 Girija Prasad Koirala (1924–2010), Nepalese politician (1925–2010), President of the Nepali Congress and Prime Minister of Nepal
 Girija Shettar (born 1969), Indian actress
 Girija Vyas (born 1946), Indian politician, poet, and author
 Girija Keer (1933–2019), Indian Marathi language writer

 Girija Prasad Joshi (1939–1987), Nepalese poet
 Girija Oak (born 1987), Indian actress
 Girija Kumar Mathur (1918–1994), Indian writer of the Hindi language

Other uses 
 Girija (village), Lithuania
 Girija Dam, in India Maharashtra
 Vanaja Girija, a 1994 Tamil comedy film directed by Keyaar